Sara N. Lampe (born January 5, 1949) is a Democratic Party member of the Missouri House of Representatives, representing District 138 (central Springfield) since 2004. She currently serves as Minority Caucus Secretary. Lampe is term limited by Missouri law from running for a House seat in 2012, and previously considered candidacy for Missouri Lieutenant Governor. In August 2018, she became the Democratic nominee for Greene County Presiding Commissioner.

Personal life and education
Representative Lampe was born and raised in Cassville, Missouri, where her mother was a long-time educator. Following graduation from Cassville School in 1967, Lampe attended Southwest Missouri State University in Springfield, earning a bachelor's degree in Elementary Education in 1971, and a master's degree in Elementary Administration in 1976. Lampe has taught in Missouri Public Schools since 1971. She began as a teacher, then spent 19 years as the principal of Phelps Center for the Gifted.

Honors and recognition
2010 Evelyn Wasserstrom Award
2008 Committed Statesperson Award from the National Multiple Sclerosis Society
The Missouri NEA-Horace Mann Award by Missouri National Education Association
Southwest MASA District Friend of Education Award 2007

Legislative Work
Lampe began the 2010 Legislative Session with legislation honoring famed Jewish civil rights leader Simon Wiesenthal. She is also sponsoring anti-bullying legislation and legislation aimed at preventing traffic accidents due to text messaging drivers. Representative Lampe serves on the following committees:  
Budget,
Appropriations – Education,
Elementary and Secondary Education
Utilities

References

External links
Missouri House of Representatives – Sara Lampe official MO House website
Project Vote Smart – Representative Sara N. Lampe (MO) profile
Follow the Money – Sara Lampe
2006 2004 campaign contributions
 http://ozarksfirst.com/fulltext?nxd_id=349816

Democratic Party members of the Missouri House of Representatives
1949 births
Living people
Women state legislators in Missouri
People from Cassville, Missouri
21st-century American women